Clarence Francis Hiskey (1912–1998), born Clarence Szczechowski, was a Soviet espionage agent in the United States.  He became active in the Communist Party USA (CPUSA) when he attended graduate school at the University of Wisconsin.  He became a professor of chemistry at the University of Tennessee, Columbia University and Brooklyn Polytechnic Institute. For a time, Hiskey worked at the Tennessee Valley Authority and the University of Chicago Metallurgical Laboratory, part of the Manhattan Project.  He was the father of Nicholas Sand.

Metallurgical Laboratory
Hiskey joined the Chicago Metallurgical Laboratory in September 1943. 
In May 1944, a  message sent by New York KGB to Moscow Venona project was intercepted and decrypted. The message contained information reporting that Bernard Schuster, member of the CPUSA secret apparatus, working for Soviet intelligence, had traveled to Chicago on the KGB's instructions. The message recorded Schuster's description of those he had come in contact with, including Rose Olsen, and stating Olsen had been meeting with Hiskey on the instructions of the organization.  In July, it appears Joseph Katz had been assigned to the Hiskey case.

On 28 April 1944, Army counter-intelligence (G-2) observed  a meeting between Clarence Hiskey and Soviet Military Intelligence (GRU) officer Arthur Adams.  Hiskey was removed from the Manhattan Project by drafting him into the Army, and stationing him in Canada for the duration of the conflict.  While en route, Army counter-intelligence officers secretly searched Hiskey's luggage and found seven pages of classified notes taken from the Chicago Metallurgical Lab. When the officers subsequently performed a follow up search, the notes were no longer with Hiskey.

Investigations
In 1948, the House Un-American Activities Committee (HUAC) established that Hiskey was an active member of the CPUSA and had attempted to recruit other scientists to pass secret atomic data to Soviet intelligence.  Congressional investigators concluded: 
It became obvious that Hiskey had for some time been supplying Adams with secret information regarding atomic research.  Immediately after seeing Adams, Hiskey flew to Cleveland, Ohio, where he contacted John Hitchcock Chapin.  Chapin, through the urging of Clarence Hiskey, agreed to take over Hiskey's contacts with Adams.

Chapin admitted to investigators that Hiskey had told him that Adams was indeed a Soviet agent. Edward Manning was another Chicago Met Lab employee Hiskey attempted to recruit.

In testimony before HUAC and Senate Internal Security Subcommittee, Hiskey repeatedly refused to answer questions about his Communist associations and espionage, and in 1950, he was cited for contempt of Congress.  Hiskey resigned his position as associate professor of analytical chemistry on the faculty of Brooklyn Polytechnic Institute and joined the International Biotechnical Corporation, later becoming director of analytical research for Endo Laboratories.

McCarthy
In June 1953, Hiskey was subpoenaed to testify before the Senate Subcommittee on Investigations.  In a closed door session, Hiskey was interrogated by Sen. Joseph McCarthy:

Sen. McCarthy: "Were you engaged in atomic energy espionage?"

Mr. Hiskey: "I refuse to answer that question."

Then after some discussion of the Fifth Amendment,

Sen. McCarthy: "That is about as definite proof as we can get here that you were an espionage agent, because if you were not, you would simply say no. That would not incriminate you. The only time it would incriminate you would be if you were an espionage agent. So when you refuse to answer on the ground it would incriminate you, that is telling us you were an agent."

Mr. Hiskey: "I don't think you understand the whole purpose of the Fifth Amendment, Senator. That amendment was put into the Constitution to protect the innocent man from just this kind of star chamber proceeding you are carrying on."

The proceeding closed with,

Ray Cohn: "There is one other question. Can you tell us any names of any Communists working on the Manhattan project?"

Mr. Hiskey: "I refuse to answer that question."

Sen. McCarthy: "On the grounds of self-incrimination."

Mr. Hiskey: "On the grounds it may tend to incriminate me."

The subcommittee did not call Hiskey to testify in public.

The recommendations on May 27, 1954 of the Personnel Security Board of the U.S. Atomic Energy Commission investigation into J. Robert Oppenheimer, director of the Manhattan Project at Los Alamos, stated Oppenheimer had been found in the company of "Joseph W. Weinberg and Clarence Hiskey, who were alleged to be members of the Communist Party and to have engaged in espionage on behalf of the Soviet Union."  Oppenheimer's security clearance was revoked the following month.

With the collapse of the Soviet Union, KGB Archives were made accessible to historian Allen Weinstein and a former KGB officer Alexander Vassiliev.  The identification of Hiskey as a Soviet agent cover named RAMSAY which occurs in the Venona papers, corroborated Hiskey's covert relationship with Soviet intelligence.

References

Bibliography
US House of Representatives, 80th Congress, Special Session, Committee on Un-American Activities, Report on Soviet Espionage Activities in Connection with the Atom Bomb, September 28, 1948 (US Gov. Printing Office).
Testimony of James Sterling Murray and Edward Tiers Manning, August 14, and October 5, 1949, U.S. Congress, House of Representatives, Committee on Un-American Activities, 81st Cong., 1st sess., 877–899.
The Shameful Years: Thirty Years of Soviet Espionage in the United States, U.S. Congress, House of Representatives, Committee on Un-American Activities, 30 December 1951.
Interlocking Subversion in Government Departments, Report of the Subcommittee to Investigate the Administration of the Internal Security Act and Other Internal Security Laws to the Committee of the Judiciary, United States Senate, 83rd Congress, 1st Session, July 30, 1953.
United States Atomic Energy Commission, In the Matter of Dr. J. Robert Oppenheimer, Washington, D.C., 27 May 1954.
FBI file Hiskey, Clarence NY-1000014092.
FBI file Hiskey, Clarence HQ-1210020641.
FBI file Hiskey, Clarence HQ-1010002118.
Atomic Spy Report Will Shock Public, Official Declares, New York Times, September 26, 1948.
William White, Indictment of Five Is Urged in Report on Atomic Spying, New York Times, September 28, 1948.
LeRoy A. Stone, Married Couple Spies, West Virginia University, Psychology of Espionage Reports, Volume III, March 2002.
Allen Weinstein and Alexander Vassiliev, The Haunted Wood: Soviet Espionage in America—the Stalin Era (New York: Random House, 1999).
Katherine A S Sibley, Red spies in America : stolen secrets and the dawn of the Cold War, University Press of Kansas, 2004.

External links
Loren C. Hurd and Clarence F. Hiskey, The determination of Rhenium, Ind. Eng. Chem. Anal. Ed.; 1938.

1912 births
1998 deaths
Manhattan Project people
Nuclear secrecy
American spies for the Soviet Union
American people in the Venona papers
Espionage in the United States
Members of the Communist Party USA
University of Wisconsin–Madison alumni
University of Tennessee faculty
Columbia University faculty
New York University faculty